Vilko Ukmar (10 February 1905, Postojna – 24 October 1991, Ljubljana) was a Slovenian composer.

He studied music in Ljubljana Music Conservatorium, but he continued on Academy of Music in Zagreb and Vienna Conservatorium. In years 1932 and 1939 he worked as music critic and publisher. Between 1939 and 1945 he was director of Ljubljana Opera House. Between 1948 and 1974 he was teaching on Academy of Music in Ljubljana and from year 1962 to 1979 also on Faculty of Arts in Ljubljana.

In year 1967 he received the Prešeren Award for ballet composition Godec (Musician). He also got Prešeren Award for his lifetime work in 1985. His music was based on romantic music, but later he made transition to expressionist music and twelve-tone technique.

His son, Kristijan Ukmar, is conductor and music teacher.

Musical opus 

 Kitajski slavček (Chinese nightingale), dance pantomime, 1953
 Lepa Vida (Beautiful Vida), ballet, 1957
 Godec (Musician), ballet, 1963

References

1905 births
1991 deaths
Prešeren Award laureates
Slovenian classical composers
Slovenian male musicians
Male classical composers